Grubbs is a surname. Notable people with the surname include:

Ben Grubbs (1984–), an American football guard
Daniel W. Grubbs (1835–1917), an American lawyer, businessman, and politician
David Grubbs (1967–), a musician
Gary Grubbs (1949–), an American actor
Robert H. Grubbs (1942–2021), an American chemist and Nobel laureate
Todd Grubbs, an American musician
Tom Grubbs (1894–1986), an American baseball pitcher
Victor Grubbs, captain of one of the aircraft involved in the Tenerife airport disaster